is a Japanese actor.

Career
Matsushige has appeared in the films such as EM Embalming, Adrenaline Drive, Last Life in the Universe, and Outrage Beyond.

He won the award for best supporting actor at the 31st Yokohama Film Festival for Dear Doctor in 2009.

Selected filmography

Film

Television

Japanese dub

References

External links
 
 
 

1963 births
Living people
Japanese male actors
People from Fukuoka
People from Fukuoka Prefecture
Actors from Fukuoka Prefecture